The Danish Voksenuddannelsescentre (VUC) is the general adult education programme which is part of the public education system in Denmark. 

There are 29 adult education centres (VUC's) in Denmark. Other VUC's include:

• Education for people with reading and writing disabilities (dyslexia)
• Preparatory education for adults (FVU)
• Higher preparatory exam courses (HF)
• Supplement examination courses at upper secondary level (GS)

Structure 

The teaching on the General Adult Education Programme is based on a single-subject structure.  The subjects can be pieced together according to the individual's own requirements and needs. It is possible to study one or more subjects at the same time.

Funding 

Since January 2007, VUC's have been self-governing institutions, teaching is financed by the Danish state via a taximeter funding.

Subjects 

Core: Offered once a year

• Danish
• Danish as a second language
• English
• French
• German
• history
• mathematics
• science and social studies

Optional: Up to each VUC centre

• arts
• basic information technology (IT)
• cooperation and communication
• Latin
• philosophy
• physical education and sport
• psychology
• public speaking.

Exams 

2 types: General Preparatory Examination and Gymnasium Examination Courses

General Preparatory Examination: Qualifies a student to have a right of access to the two-year higher preparatory examination courses (gymnasium).

Tested in 5 subjects:

• Danish or Danish as a second language
• English
• mathematics 
• and two more subjects as chosen by the student

Must pass with a 02 on the 7-point scale

Certificates 

The certificates are equivalent to the certificates offered at the School Leaving Examination. They are for students who have passed the examination in a single subjects or the General Preparatory Examination.  A certificate of attendance is also available.

References

https://web.archive.org/web/20150320043205/http://eng.uvm.dk/Fact-Sheets/Adult-education-and-continuing-training/The-General-Adult-Education-Programme

Education in Denmark
Adult education